The Young Greens (GU) are the youth wing of the Swedish Green Party, founded in 1986.

GU is a part of the Swedish Green party, and membership in GU automatically includes membership in the Green Party for all members not turning 26 that year. Members of GU may, for example, hold elected any elected position within the Green Party where there is no legally binding age limit, with the same principles applying to the Green Students.

Logo 
After a membership vote in 2012, the Young Greens changed their logo to the current one, an abstracted green leaf with the name of the organisation. 547 members participated in the vote. 

Previously, the organisation had a green footprint as its logo. This was adopted at 2005 annual general meeting in Gothenburg and symbolised the impact humans have on the earth during their lifetime, and the importance of that impact being as easy to wash away as a footprint on a beach is by waves. The symbol had been used for several years before it was adopted unofficially, and it was only adopted at the meeting because another motion had been proposed to adopt a green star to represent the entire green movement.

Organisation

Membership 
As of 31 December 2016, number of members was 3,034.

Members who do not turn 26 or older in the year in question are automatically also members of GU's mother party as well, without having to pay the usual membership fee.

Spokes- and Chairpersons 
Like the Green Party, the Young Greens have two spokespersons, but unlike its mother party both can be female. Aida Badeli has been co-spokesperson since 2019 and Rebecka Forsberg since 2022.

Other details 
Until 2016 GU did not have a program of its own, and was unique among Swedish political youth organizations in following the program and policies of its mother party. 

GU was founded at a conference in Sollentunaholms slott outside Stockholm on 28−30 November 1986.

During the period of 1990−92, GU was a federation of autonomous local units but in 1992, it was again reconstructed as a national organisation.

GU is a member of the Federation of Young European Greens (FYEG), where it is one of the larger member organisations by budget and membership.

References

External links
 Grön Ungdom 

Youth wings of political parties in Sweden
Youth wings of green parties in Europe
Political parties established in 1986
1986 establishments in Sweden